"Hearts in the Air" is a song by Swedish singer Eric Saade, featuring Swedish rapper J-Son, from Saade's second studio album, Saade Vol. 1 (2011). Saade co-wrote the song with Robin Fredriksson, Mattias Larsson, and J-Son along with its producer Jason Gill. It is a europop song, featuring guest vocals from J-Son. The song was released on 3 June 2011 through Roxy Recordings, serving as the third single from the album.

"Hearts in the Air" peaked at number two in Sweden, becoming his third top-three single in the country. It also managed to chart in Russia and Ukraine. The song has been certified gold by the Swedish Recording Industry Association (GLF) for selling more than 20,000 copies in the region.

In 2017, Swedish electropop duo Icona Pop covered and rearranged the song as "Heart in the Air" in the eighth season of the Swedish reality television show, Så mycket bättre. The version peaked at number seventy in Sweden. In the show, Saade recorded the cover version of the duo's 2012 song, "We Got The World".

Commercial performance
"Hearts in the Air" debuted at number two in Sweden, becoming Saade's third top-three single as well as J-Son's first charting single. The song charted in the country for fifteen weeks and has been certified gold by the Swedish Recording Industry Association (GLF) for selling more than 20,000 copies in the region.

Music video
The music video, directed by Swedish director Patric Ullaeus, premiered on 29 June 2011. About the video, Eric Saade said that “it's a video with a lot of summer feelings from [him] and J-Son”.

Track listing

Credits 
Credits adapted from Saade Vol. 1s liner notes.
Eric Saade – lead vocals, songwriting 
Julimar Santos – featured vocals, songwriting
Jason Gill - songwriting, production, programming, instruments, backing vocals, recording engineering
Robin Fredriksson – songwriting
Mattias Larsson – songwriting
Henrik Edenhed – mixing engineering
Björn Engelmann – mastering

Charts

Certifications

Release history

Icona Pop version

In 2017, Swedish duo Icona Pop recorded the cover and rearranged version of "Hearts in the Air" as a part of the eighth season of the Swedish reality television show, Så mycket bättre. The version, titled "Heart in the Air", was released on November 12, 2017 through TEN Music Group, Big Beat, and Atlantic Records. The version was rearranged by the duo with the altered lyrics and melodies and produced by Emanuel Abrahamsson and Nicki Adamsson. Later, the version was on their extended play, Så mycket bättre 2017 – Tolkningarna (2017), which compiles all the songs the duo performed on the show.

Background
Icona Pop and Eric Saade appeared on the eighth season of the Swedish reality television show, Så mycket bättre (2017), along with Kikki Danielsson, Sabina Ddumba, Moneybrother, Uno Svenningsson and Tomas Andersson Wij. In the show, the musicians rearrange and record the hit songs by each musician, and the duo picked "Hearts in the Air" from Saade's discography. The performance was televised on November 11, 2017, on TV4.

Chart performance
The cover version debuted at number seventy in Sweden, becoming the duo's twelfth charting single in the region. It charted on the chart for two weeks.

Charts

References

External links
Eric Saade Official Website
Eric Saade Official Facebookpage

2011 singles
Eric Saade songs
Songs written by Jason Gill (musician)
Songs written by J-Son
Songs written by Robin Fredriksson
Songs written by Eric Saade
Songs written by Mattias Larsson
Roxy Recordings singles
All Around the World Productions singles
2011 songs